The National Certificate of Educational Achievement (NCEA) is the official secondary-school qualification in New Zealand. Phased in between 2002 and 2004, it replaced three older secondary-school qualifications. The New Zealand Qualifications Authority administers NCEA.

History

NCEA Level 1 replaced School Certificate in 2002, Level 2 replaced Sixth Form Certificate in 2003 and Level 3 replaced Bursary in 2004. A transitional Sixth Form Certificate was offered by schools in 2003 and 2004.

System

The NCEA system has three levels – one, two, and three – corresponding to their respective levels on the National Qualifications Framework. Each level is generally studied in each of the three final years of secondary schooling, with NCEA Level 1 in Year 11, NCEA Level 2 in Year 12, and NCEA Level 3 in Year 13, although it is not uncommon for students to study across multiple levels.

To pass each level, students must gain a certain number of credits at that level or above. Credits are awarded through students passing unit standards or achievement standards. Each school subject is made up of multiple standards – for example, Mathematics at Level 1 is made up of 13 achievement standards, including separate standards for number, algebra, geometry, trigonometry, statistics and probability.

Unit and achievement standards represent the two kinds of standards used in NCEA. Both use criterion-based marking, which means students need to meet the specified criteria for each grade level to achieve at that level. However, unit standards are 'competency based' whereas achievement standards derive from the New Zealand Curriculum. Most unit standards use a simple Achieved/Not Achieved system, whereas achievement standards use a four-grade scale: Not Achieved (N), Achieved (A), Merit (M) and Excellence (E). Furthermore, each standard is assigned a particular credit value. For instance, Standard 91394 (Analyse ideas and values of the classical world) is worth four credits while Standard 91587 (Apply systems of simultaneous equations in solving problems) is worth 3 credits.

Assessment of individuals is administered both internally and externally. Internal assessments are assessed at the school level throughout the school year. External assessments are assessed at a national level, usually (but not exclusively) by examinations held at the end of the school year in November and December.

Achievement and endorsements 
The number of credits required to pass each level is as follows. Credits can be reused for multiple certificates:
 NCEA Level 1 – 80 credits at Level One or higher, of which 10 must be in literacy and 10 must be in numeracy.
 NCEA Level 2 – 80 credits total, of which 60 credits must be at Level Two or higher. Students must also have achieved 10 literacy and 10 numeracy credits at Level One or higher.
 NCEA Level 3 – 80 credits total, of which 60 credits must be at Level Three or higher and 20 credits must be at Level Two or higher. Students must also have achieved 10 literacy and 10 numeracy credits at Level One or higher.

Candidates who achieve a large number of Merit and Excellence standards can have certificates endorsed with Merit or Excellence. To gain a level certificate with Merit endorsement, a student must pass the level with at least 50 Merit and Excellence credits assessed at that level or higher. Likewise, to gain a level certificate with Excellence endorsement, a student must pass the level with at least 50 Excellence credits assessed at that level or higher.

In 2011, course endorsements were introduced. To gain a Merit course endorsement a candidate must achieve 14 credits at Merit or Excellence within a given year. Additionally, 3 credits must be internally assessed and 3 externally assessed. 3 exceptions exist for Physical Education, Religious Studies and Level Three Visual Arts, as all standards in these subjects are either entirely internally or externally assessed. An Excellence endorsement requires all 14 credits to be achieved with Excellence.

Exam process and marking 
Grade Score Marking (GSM) was also introduced in 2011, along with the realigned Level One standards. Like the realignment, GSM was phased in so that only Level One externals were marked with GSM in 2011. Under GSM each question earns up to 8 marks, with two marks per each of the grades (NAME). N0 also exists for "no response, no evidence". The Grade Score Marks for each question are totalled and the overall mark for the standard is determined from that total, based on NZQA determined cut-scores. However, candidates would still ultimately receive one of four marks (NAME) whether or not the standard (such as 91098) was out of 8 or 32 (for example, 90948). The rationale behind the change was threefold: it would clarify marks for candidates, motivate them to improve and improve consistency in marking.

According to NZQA, NCEA is the only secondary school qualification worldwide where marked examination papers are returned to students. After the examination papers have been returned, a student can apply for certain papers to be reviewed if a marking or clerical error has occurred (e.g. the paper has not been fully marked, the marks have been added up incorrectly, the examination paper shows a different result from their results notice), or they can apply for certain papers to be remarked ("reconsidered") if they feel they have not been assessed correctly.

Extensive online resources for standards can be found on NZQA's website.

University entrance

For NCEA candidates the prerequisites for the University Entrance award were changed in 2014 for the university year beginning 2015. Candidates have since been required to:
Achieve NCEA Level 3
Gain 14 credits in each of three Approved Subjects
Meet the Literacy and Numeracy standards based on Level Two and Level One credits across a multitude of standards and subjects.

Not all subjects are approved for university admission and, as such, NZQA publishes a list of approved subjects and standards. Credits not gained in approved subjects cannot count towards University Entrance.

Individual universities set their own entrance standards for specific degree programmes, but NCEA students must still meet the University Entrance standard set by NCEA. The only exception to this applies to a discretionary entrance, which is subject to its own requirements. Non-NCEA pupils are admitted by universities based on their qualifications.

NCEA is also accepted internationally, but overseas institutes and countries set their own requirements and NZQA may convert NCEA into comparable measures of performance on a case-by-case basis.

The University Entrance award has been criticised on the grounds that it is 'convoluted', insufficient for admission to New Zealand's universities and seen as inadequate by universities domestic and foreign.

Subjects

University approved

Controversy and media

In January 2013, hundreds of students were able to access their grades a day before they were due to be released, after they were accidentally posted online.

In June 2014 NZQA released a press statement saying that nearly 25% of the 2013 internal assessments were incorrectly marked. Students were nevertheless able to use the wrongly awarded credits to gain NCEA. Each year NZQA takes a random sample of internal assessment for close checking. In some schools, nearly all the credits gained are from internal assessments. Additionally, lower decile schools tend to both use internal assessment more and have larger gaps between internal and external achievement rates when compared to higher decile schools. NZQA said there were more mistakes than usual as new standards had been introduced during the ongoing realignment and teachers had not yet adjusted their marking.

In July 2015, James Cote and Michael Johnston suggested that grade inflation was behind the increases in NCEA student pass rates. This suggestion was further expressed in an article published in April 2017.

In September 2016, the Level One MCAT (Maths Common Assessment Test) was criticised for being set at a level that was "far too difficult", although Education Minister Hekia Parata commented that 'overall achievement in the assessment was "in line with expectations and higher than 2015"'.

References

External links 
 NCEA website

Education in New Zealand
Secondary school qualifications
Graduation
2002 introductions